Shirley Bear (born May 16, 1936) is a Tobique First Nation artist, traditional herbalist, poet, and activist.  She is an original member of the Wabanaki language group of New Brunswick.

Background 
The daughter of Susan Paul-Bear and Noel Bear Jr., she was born on the Negootgook reserve in New Brunswick, attended the Collège Maillet in Saint-Basile and went on to study photography and painting in New Hampshire. In 1968, she received a Ford Foundation fellowship.

Artistry 
Her work has appeared in exhibitions at the Clement Cormier Gallery in Moncton, at the Université Saint-Louis in Edmundston, as well as in group exhibitions in Canada and the United States. In 2011, the Beaverbrook Art Gallery organized a major retrospective exhibition called Nekt wikuhpon ehpit — Once there lived a woman, The Painting, Poetry and Politics of Shirley Bear (curated by Terry Graff). Her work is included in the collections of the National Indian Art Centre, the Beaverbrook Art Gallery, Carleton University, First Nations House of Learning at the University of British Columbia, the University of Moncton, and the Canadian Museum of History's permanent collection.

Works held at the New Brunswick Art Bank include Crane Woman, Abenaki Woman, and Moose with a Woman's Spirit.

In 1990, she was curator for a touring exhibition of art by native women, Changers: A Spiritual Renaissance.

She was the subject of a short National Film Board film Minqwon Minqwon by Catherine Martin which was produced in 1990. Bear advocates for work to be done in attaining the peaceful existence that existed between men and women in North America before the arrival of the Europeans.

Advocacy 
Shirley Bear has been a longtime advocate for the rights of Indigenous women. In 1980, Bear became involved with the Tobique Women's Group, starting with activities at the Big Cove Reserve involving the unjust treatment of single mothers and housing. Later in the year, Bear was invited the Tobique Women's Group to participate in a meeting of Aboriginal women interested in establishing a political body that would represent Indigenous women from the Canadian province of New Brunswick.

Awards and honors 
In 2002, she received the New Brunswick Arts Board's Excellence in the Arts Award.

In 2011, she was named to the Order of Canada.

Works 
Her work includes a variety of anthologies, including The Color of Resistance: A Contemporary Collection of Writing by Aboriginal Women.

Some of her well-known books include:
"Nekt wikuhpon ehpit Once there lived a woman: The Painting, Poetry and Politics of Shirley Bear," an exhibition catalogue written by Terry Graff, with accompanying essays by Susan Crean and Carol Taylor.
Nine Micmac Legends, Alden Nowlan; Illustrations: Shirley Bear
Enough is Enough (1987)
Everywoman's Almanac (1991)
The Colour of Resistance (1993)
Kelusultiek (1994)
Virgin Bones / Belayak Kcikug'nas'ikn'ug (2006) which was her own collection of artwork, poetry, and other political pieces (published by McGilligan Books).
Some of her well-known pieces from Virgin Bones include:
Freeport, Maine
History Resource Material
Baqwa'sun Wuli, Baqwa'sun
September Morning
Fragile Freedoms

References 

1936 births
Living people
Maliseet people
Artists from New Brunswick
Canadian women poets
Members of the Order of Canada
Writers from New Brunswick
20th-century Canadian poets
20th-century Canadian women writers
21st-century Canadian poets
21st-century Canadian women writers
20th-century Canadian women artists